Moșnița Nouă ( or Újmosnica) is a commune in Timiș County, Romania. It is composed of five villages: Albina, Moșnița Nouă (commune seat), Moșnița Veche, Rudicica and Urseni.

Geography 
Moșnița Nouă is located in the central part of Timiș County, about 8 km from Timișoara city center. Due to the urban evolution on the territory that separates it from Timișoara, Moșnița Nouă has become practically attached to it. The territory of the commune occupies a total area of 6,900 ha, of which:
 285 ha – Bistra Forest;
 1,821 ha – built-up area;
 4,794 ha – unincorporated area.

History 
As its name suggests, Moșnița Nouă ("New Moșnița") is relatively newly established, having a little over 100 years of existence. It was founded in 1902 by Hungarian settlers from the Békés County and the Hungarian town of Szentes. They were brought here by the Austro-Hungarian administration that ordered the old inhabitants to be dispossessed of the necessary lands, the area of the current site to be deforested and also ordered the construction of the new settlement exclusively of ethnic Hungarians. Over time, Moșnița Nouă surpassed the old settlement Moșnița Veche (first mentioned in 1332) in terms of importance and became the seat of the commune with the same name.

Moșnița Veche dates from 1332; in 1890 it was part of Temes County, Timișoara District, it was a seat of commune and had 2,208 inhabitants. The oral tradition attributes to a Romanian Niță the foundation of the village of Moșnița, not on today's location but in Satu Bătrân, one kilometer away, near the Subuleasa brook. Due to the frequent floods, Niță moved the village on today's location. The landlords kept the right of ownership over the old village and its border until 1820, when this right was taken away from them, receiving in return the right over the forest near the village (to the south). In 1904, their right to the forest was taken away, which was cleared, and in its place the Austro-Hungarian administration set up a colony with ethnic Hungarians, the future Moșnița Nouă. 

Urseni is about as old as Moșnița Veche. It was known until the 20th century by its Hungarian name Medves, despite the fact that the village was mostly Romanian. In 1890 it was part of Temes County, Timișoara District and was a seat of commune.

Albina was established in 1925 by colonizing with 70 Romanian families originating from Sebeșu de Jos, Sibiu County, as well as seven families from Sadu, Sibiu County. Each settler owned 8 ha of arable land and 2,877 m2 of land for house and garden. In order to raise their households, the settlers were financially supported by Albina Bank from Sibiu. For this reason, it took the name of the credit institute that made possible the establishment of the village.

Rudicica is the most recent village of the commune, a small hamlet of Moșnița that was formed in the 1950s.

Demographics 

Moșnița Nouă had a population of 6,203 inhabitants at the 2011 census, up 44% from the 2002 census. Most inhabitants are Romanians (82.17%), with a minority of Hungarians (8.79%). For 6.88% of the population, ethnicity is unknown. By religion, most inhabitants are Orthodox (69.64%), but there are also minorities of Pentecostals (9.72%), Roman Catholics (6.46%), Reformed (4.66%) and Baptists (1.06%). For 7.04% of the population, religious affiliation is unknown.

References 

Communes in Timiș County
Localities in Romanian Banat